This list of the notable alumni of the University of Cape Town is divided into the six faculties of the university: Commerce, Humanities, Sciences, Health Sciences, Engineering, and Law.

Commerce
 Raymond Ackerman, businessman, who purchased the Pick 'n Pay supermarket group from its founder
Roelof Botha, grandson of Pik Botha; began his career as an actuary and became a venture capitalist
Chelsy Davy, ex-girlfriend of Britain's Prince Harry
Sir Bradley Fried, ex-chief executive of Investec Bank Plc
Geordin Hill-Lewis, Mayor of Cape Town (2021- )
Nick Mallett, played for and later coached the Springboks, South Africa's national rugby union team
Tshediso Matona, CEO of Eskom
Mark Nielsen, CEO of Talent
Mark Shuttleworth, billionaire entrepreneur; founder of Canonical Ltd; sponsor of the Ubuntu Linux distribution; second space tourist

Humanities
Lauren Beukes, international best-selling author of The Shining Girls, winner of Arthur C. Clarke Award
J. M. Coetzee, Professor Emeritus, Literature, 2003
Jean Comaroff, professor of anthropology at the University of Chicago
John Comaroff, professor of anthropology at the University of Chicago
Harold Cressy, head teacher and first coloured person to gain a degree in South Africa
Janette Deacon, archaeologist specialising in heritage management and rock art conservation
Roger Ebert, film critic, graduated with an English degree as part of a Rotary International program
David Fanning, Emmy Award-winning producer of Frontline
Bobby Godsell, Masters of Arts, later CEO of AngloGold Ashanti and Chairman of Eskom
Johannes de Villiers Graaff, professor of welfare economics; economist
Adrian Guelke, Professor of Comparative Politics at Queen's University Belfast
Jan Hendrik Hofmeyr, deputy prime minister of South Africa, obtained an M.A. at the age of 17
Philip Edgecumbe Hughes, New Testament scholar, Professor at Westminster Theological Seminary
Edward Neville Isdell, former CEO of the Coca-Cola Company
Gail Kelly, CEO of Westpac; 8th most influential woman in the world, according to Forbes magazine
David Lewis-Williams, Professor emeritus of Cognitive Archaeology at the University of the Witwatersrand specialising in Upper-Palaeolithic and Bushmen rock art
Gwen Lister, South African-born Namibian journalist; anti-apartheid activist; founder of The Namibian
Nicolaas Petrus van Wyk Louw, Afrikaans-language poet, playwright and scholar
 Thabo Makgoba, Archbishop of Cape Town, PhD from the University of Cape Town.
Steven Markovitz, award-winning film and television producer
André du Pisani, political scientist and professor at University of Namibia
Nik Rabinowitz, comedian, actor and author
Mamphela Ramphele, managing director of the World Bank; former Vice-Chancellor of UCT
Isaac Schapera, Professor of Anthropology at the London School of Economics; leading expert in the anthropology of South African tribesmen
Nora Schimming-Chase, Namibia's first ambassador to Germany, obtained a teaching diploma from UCT in 1961
Carmel Schrire, Professor of Archaeology, Rutgers University
Robert Carl-Heinz Shell, South African author and professor of African Studies
Lady Skollie, feminist artist and activist
Lady Kitty Spencer (born 1990), English model
Andries Treurnicht, founder and the leader of the Conservative Party in South Africa
Elizabeth Anne Voigt, archaeologist and director of the McGregor Museum 
Mary Watson, 2006 winner of the Caine Prize for African Writing
Ebrahim Patel, held positions as South African Minister of Trade and Industry and as the Minister of Economic Development, on the University Council of UCT and was former staffer in the Southern African Labour and Development Research Unit in the School of Economics. 
Archie Mafeje, anthropologist and activist who significantly contributed to the decolonization of African identity and its historical past, criticising anthropology's typically Eurocentric techniques and beliefs. He is also known for the "Mafeje affair".

Music
Richard Cock, conductor
Cromwell Everson, classical music composer and composer of the first Afrikaans opera
Ernest Fleischmann, impresario best known for his tenure at the Los Angeles Philharmonic
Malcolm Forsyth, musician; composer; Canadian Composer of the Year; Juno Award winner; member of Order of Canada
Hendrik Hofmeyr, composer and music theorist; winner of the 1997 Queen Elisabeth of Belgium Composition Prize; Professor of Music at the South African College of Music, University of Cape Town
Galt MacDermot, composer of the musical Hair
Melanie Scholtz, vocalist, operas, jazz, pop, r&b, and classical music. Graduated from the School of Opera
Barry Smith, organist, conductor, musicologist, former Associate Professor of Music at the South African College of Music, University of Cape Town
Désirée Talbot, operatic soprano and one of the founding members of the UCT Opera Company
Pretty Yende, operatic soprano.

Fine art
Anne Bean, British installation and performance artist 
Alex Binaris, fashion model
Breyten Breytenbach, author
Roger Ebert, Pulitzer Award-winning American film critic and writer
Kai Lossgott, interdisciplinary artist
Simphiwe Ndzube, visual artist
Jonathan Shapiro, South African political cartoonist known as "Zapiro"
Claudette Schreuders, South African sculptor and painter
Marjorie van Heerden, South African writer and illustrator of children's books
Pauline Vogelpoel, arts administrator at the Contemporary Art Society and Tate Gallery

Drama
Jodi Balfour, actress
Katlego Danke, actress
Nadia Davids, playwright, novelist, and author of short stories, and screenplays.
Vincent Ebrahim, known for his role on The Kumars at No. 42
Richard E. Grant, actor
Kagiso Lediga, stand-up comedian, actor and director
Zolani Mahola, lead singer of the South African band Freshlyground
Zandile Msutwana, actress
Koleka Putuma, poet and theatre-maker

Sciences
Professor Allan McLeod Cormack, Medicine, 1979
Hilary Deacon, Professor of Archaeology at the University of Stellenbosch specialising in the emergence of modern humans and African archaeology
Emanuel Derman, Goldman Sachs financial engineer and author of My Life As A Quant
Jonathan M. Dorfan, director of the Stanford Linear Accelerator Center
Professor Mulalo Doyoyo, South African engineer and inventor; known for inventing cenocell, a cementless concrete
George Ellis, cosmologist; collaborator with Stephen Hawking; winner of the 2004 Templeton Prize
Tim Hawarden, astrophysicist
Michael David Kirchmann, architect and developer, founder of GDSNY
Sir Aaron Klug, Chemistry, 1982
Paul Maritz, former Microsoft executive; VMware CEO
Magdalena Sauer, first woman to qualify as an architect in South Africa
Sydney Harold Skaife, South African entomologist and naturalist
Stanley Skewes, number theorist most famous in popular mathematics for his bound for the point of changeover in magnitude between the number of primes up to a certain number and an important approximation of this, which was for many years the largest finite number ever legitimately used in a research paper
Edith Layard Stephens, South African botanist
Willem Van Biljon, former co-founder of Mosaic Software, acquired by S1 Corporation ; founder of Nimbula, a startup funded by Sequoia Capital
Richard van der Riet Woolley, British astronomer who became Astronomer Royal

Health sciences
Neil Aggett, South African trade union leader and labour activist who died in custody after 70 days' detention without trial
Frances Ames, first woman to receive an MD degree from UCT; first female professor at UCT
Professor Christiaan Barnard, performed the world's first heart transplant at Groote Schuur Hospital
Alan Christoffels bioinformatics scientist, academic, and an author
Enid Charles, statistician and demographer
David Cooper, theorist and leader in the anti-psychiatry movement
Tamaryn Green, medical doctor, Miss South Africa 2018 and 1st runner-up at Miss Universe 2018
Cecil Helman, physician, medical anthropologist and author
Margaret Keay (1911-1998), plant pathologist
 Mervyn Maze, anaesthesiologist, medical researcher and academic
 Riaad Moosa, comedian, actor and doctor
Bongani Mayosi, cardiologist and Dean of the Faculty of Medicine
Jean Nachega, physician, infectious diseases doctor and academic
Max Theiler, virologist awarded the Nobel Prize in Physiology or Medicine in 1951 for developing a vaccine against yellow fever
Louis Vogelpoel, cardiologist and one of the founding members of the Cardiac Clinic at Groote Schuur Hospital as well as a highly regarded horticultural scholar and researcher
Carolyn Williamson, virologist and microbiologist, professor of medical virology 
Heather Zar, paediatric pulmonologist and Chair Department of Paediatrics

Social sciences
John Karlin, industrial psychologist whose research led to the rectangular push-button telephone
Debora Patta, broadcast journalist and television producer
 Joel Pollak, editor-in-chief of Breitbart News
Josina Z. Machel, women's rights activist
Wanga Zembe-Mkabile, social policy researcher

Law

Sheila Camerer, South African politician; former Deputy Minister of Justice; long-serving Member of Parliament of the main opposition the Democratic Alliance; ambassador to Bulgaria; completed a Bachelor of Law degree at UCT in 1964
Ryan Coetzee, South African politician; former CEO of the Democratic Alliance and Shadow Minister of Economic Development; chief strategist for Western Cape premier Helen Zille; graduated from UCT in 1994
Beric John Croome, Advocate of the High Court of South Africa; Chartered Accountant CA (SA); taxpayers' rights pioneer; completed a Bachelor of Commerce degree (1980), Certificate in the Theory of Accountancy (1981) and a PhD (Commercial Law) (2008) at UCT
 Stephen Jolly, Australian activist and politician.
 Zainunnisa "Cissie" Gool, anti-apartheid political and civil rights leader
Ian Neilson, Executive Deputy Mayor of Cape Town
Kate O'Regan, former Constitutional Court of South Africa judge
Dullah Omar, South African anti-apartheid activist; lawyer; Justice of the Constitutional Court of South Africa; minister in the South African cabinet from 1994 until his death
Justice Albie Sachs, of the Constitutional Court of South Africa
James Selfe, long-serving Member of Parliament with the Democratic Alliance; chairperson of the party's federal council; holds a master's degree from UCT
Donald Woods, South African journalist and anti-apartheid activist
Percy Yutar, South Africa's first Jewish attorney-general and prosecutor of Nelson Mandela in the 1963 Rivonia Treason Trial.
Zuleikha Hassan, Kenyan Politician - Kwale County Woman Representative and Member of Parliament
Fana Mokoena, South African politician and actor, member of the National Assembly of South Africa and a delegate to the National Council of Provinces
David Bloomberg, former Mayor of Cape Town (1973-1975) and defence attorney for Dimitri Tsafendas, who fatally stabbed the Prime Minister, Dr H.F. Verwoerd, in Parliament in 1966

References

 
Cape Town
University